Ceccaisculitoides is an extinct genus of ammonoids in the family Paragoceratidae. The genus name is a tribute to Fabrizzio Cecca, researcher at Pierre-and-Marie-Curie University, Paris.

The type species is C. elegans. The type specimen is named JGX-1004. It is 23 mm wide. It comes from North Humboldt Range, Nevada (level JGX-2360B).

References

External links 

 
 

Ceratitida genera
Paragoceratidae